Phyllonorycter strigulatella is a moth of the family Gracillariidae. It is found in the most of Europe (except Ireland, the Iberian Peninsula and Greece), east to Russia and Japan.

The wingspan is 7–9 mm. There are two generations per year with adults on wing in May and again in late July and August.

The larvae feed on Alnus incana and Alnus minor. They mine the leaves of their host plant. They create an elongated, lower-surface, tentiform mine which is contracted in a tubular manner in the end. The mine usually starts near the midrib. The lower epidermis has many weak wrinkles but no clear folds. There are often several mines in a single leaf. The mines have a distinct brown tinge. The frass is accumulated in an angle of the mine. The pupa is made in a white cocoon that is free from frass.

References

External links

strigulatella
Moths described in 1846
Moths of Asia
Moths of Europe
Taxa named by Friederike Lienig
Taxa named by Philipp Christoph Zeller